Apichart Denman (born July 20, 1997) is a Thai professional footballer who plays as a winger for Thai League 1 club PT Prachuap.

References

External links
 

1997 births
Living people
Apichart Denman
Apichart Denman
Association football midfielders
Apichart Denman
Apichart Denman